Doña Francisquita is a 1952 Spanish musical comedy film directed by Ladislao Vajda. It was entered into the 1953 Cannes Film Festival.

Plot
Francisquita secretly loves Fernando, but he has fallen in love with Aurora, a purebred Madrid woman used to flirting with all men. Cardona, a friend of Fernando's, decides to help Francisquita, even at the risk of confusing everything.

Cast
 Mirtha Legrand as Doña Francisquita
 Armando Calvo as Fernando
 Antonio Casal as Cardona
 Manolo Morán as Lorenzo
 Emma Penella as Aurora 'La Beltrana'
 Julia Lajos as Doña Francisca
 José Isbert as Maestro Lambertini
 Jesús Tordesillas as Don Matías
 Ángel Álvarez as Un señor (uncredited)
 Antonio Riquelme as Pepe (uncredited)

References

External links

1952 films
1952 musical comedy films
1950s Spanish-language films
Films directed by Ladislao Vajda
Spanish musical comedy films
1950s Spanish films